io_uring (previously known as aioring) is a Linux kernel system call interface for storage device asynchronous I/O operations addressing performance issues with similar interfaces provided by functions like / or / etc. for operations on data accessed by file descriptors.

Development is ongoing, worked on primarily by Jens Axboe at Meta.

Interface

It works by creating two circular buffers, called "queue rings", for storage of submission and completion of I/O requests, respectively. For storage devices, these are called the submission queue (SQ) and completion queue (CQ). Keeping these buffers shared between the kernel and application helps to boost the I/O performance by eliminating the need to issue extra and expensive system calls to copy these buffers between the two. According to the io_uring design paper, the SQ buffer is writable only by consumer applications, and the CQ buffer is writable only by the kernel.

History

The kernel interface was adopted in Linux kernel version 5.1. The  library provides an API to interact with the kernel interface easily from userspace.  The Linux kernel has supported asynchronous I/O since version 2.5, but it was seen as difficult to use and inefficient. This older API only supported certain niche use cases.

References

External links 
 Efficient I/O with io_uring, in-depth description of motivation behind io_uring, interface (data structures etc.), and performance assessment
  source repository
  source directory in the Linux kernel repository

Interfaces of the Linux kernel
Linux kernel features
Articles with underscores in the title